Clarence Arthur Tripp Jr. (1919–2003) was an American psychologist, writer, and researcher for Alfred Kinsey.

Born on October 4, 1919 in Denton, Texas and attended Corsicana High School in May 1938. He studied at the New York Institute of Photography in New York City and in 1940, he became a member of the Society of Motion Picture Engineers. He also studied photography at the Eastman School of Photography, Rochester Athenaeum and Mechanics Institute (now Rochester Institute of Technology). He graduated from Rochester Athenaeum and Mechanics Institute in 1941 where he majored in commercial photography. He served in the United States Navy. In February 1943, he took a job at 20th Century Fox in New York City. 
 
Tripp worked with Kinsey at the Kinsey Institute for Research in Sex, Gender and Reproduction in Bloomington, Indiana from 1948 to 1956. He earned a PhD in Clinical psychology from New York University. Tripp drew attention with a book, published posthumously, wherein he made the case that Abraham Lincoln had several same-sex relationships.

Works
The Homosexual Matrix
The Intimate World of Abraham Lincoln

References

External links

1919 births
2003 deaths
20th-century American LGBT people
21st-century American LGBT people
20th-century American psychologists
American LGBT scientists
American LGBT writers
New York Institute of Photography alumni
Rochester Institute of Technology alumni
United States Navy sailors